Alpinimonas psychrophila is a psychrophilic, non-motile, Gram-positive and Gram-variable species of bacteria from the family of Microbacteriaceae which has been isolated from cryoconite of a alpine glacier.

References

Microbacteriaceae
Monotypic bacteria genera
Bacteria described in 2012